Bryon Allen (born May 1, 1992) is an American professional basketball player for Parma Basket of the VTB United League. Allen played college basketball for the George Mason Patriots from 2010 until 2014.

Professional career
On August 14, 2016, Allen signed with ČEZ Basketball Nymburk of the Czech NBL. He averaged 13.9 points and 3.1 assists over 42 NBL games.

On June 18, 2017, Allen signed with EWE Baskets Oldenburg of the German Basketball Bundesliga. On December 12, 2017, he parted ways with Oldenburg. Four days later, he signed with Turkish club Pınar Karşıyaka.

On June 30, 2018, Allen signed with the Italian club Basket Brescia Leonessa.

On December 20, 2018, Allen signed with Pallacanestro Reggiana.

On August 14, 2019, Allen signed with KK Zadar. He averaged 18 points per game. On October 9, 2020, Allen signed with Basketball Löwen Braunschweig of the German Basketball Bundesliga.

In February 2021, Allen signed for Studentski centar. 

On August 2, 2021, Allen signed with Hapoel Eilat of the Israeli Basketball Premier League.

In summer 2022, he signed with Parma Basket of the VTB United League.

References

External links
George Mason Patriots profile

1992 births
Living people
American expatriate basketball people in Croatia
American expatriate basketball people in the Czech Republic
American expatriate basketball people in Germany
American expatriate basketball people in Italy
American expatriate basketball people in Montenegro
American expatriate basketball people in Poland
American expatriate basketball people in Turkey
American men's basketball players
Basket Brescia Leonessa players
Basketball players from Maryland
Basketball Nymburk players
EWE Baskets Oldenburg players
George Mason Patriots men's basketball players
Guards (basketball)
Karşıyaka basketball players
KK Studentski centar players
KK Zadar players
Lega Basket Serie A players
Parma Basket players
People from Largo, Maryland
Roseto Sharks players
Sportspeople from the Washington metropolitan area
Start Lublin players